Mirabilit is a rural locality (a settlement) and the administrative center of Mirabilitsky Selsoviet, Kulundinsky District, Altai Krai, Russia. The population was 412 as of 2013. There are 4 streets.

Geography 
Mirabilit is located 8 km east of Kulunda (the district's administrative centre) by road. Kulunda is the nearest rural locality.

References 

Rural localities in Kulundinsky District